This is a list of the 21 appointed delegates to the European Parliament for Austria (from 1 January 1995 until 12 October 1996), ordered by name. The first Austrian MEP elections were held on 13 October 1996.

List

Austria
List
1995